Yukon Electoral District No. 2  was a territorial electoral district in the Yukon Territory Canada. The electoral district was created in 1903.

Results

1903 general election

References

External links
Elections Yukon

Former Yukon territorial electoral districts
1903 establishments in Yukon